International French School (Singapore) (IFS) (LFS) is a French international school in Singapore certified by the French Ministry of Education. Operational for over 50 years, IFS delivers a bilingual French-English education for international students aged 2 to 18, from kindergarten to high school. Its campus, located on Ang Mo Kio Avenue 3, has  of space.

History
The predecessor of this institution opened in 1967. 13 years later several French companies spent three million Singapore dollars to establish and create an established French international school, and in September 1984 the school opened in a Bukit Tinggi campus. Around 1993 the primary school moved to a rental property on Thomson Road due to growth at the school, and in that year the school began establishing plans for a new campus. The current campus at Ang Mo Kio Avenue 3, initially designed to house 1,000 pupils, opened in May 1999. At a later point, the school began an expansion project so the campus could house 2,400 students; as part of the project, there would be 26 additional classrooms in a structure built on top of the previous kindergarten facility. The primary CP/CP1 and kindergarten levels were temporarily moved to the former Serangoon Garden South School facility. The secondary school offers an international option of the baccalaureate, which is an honor course for this exam. It has been for many years forming students for Ivy Leagues and prépa Parisienne. In 2016 the school opened a separate campus on Ang Mo Kio 2900 for the primary students. They are now looking forward to adding another building on the primary campus to be able to transfer the kindergarten kids from the middle school and high school campus to the primary one. In January 2020 the school had officially changed from 'Lycee Francais de Singapour' to 'International French School of Singapore'

Student body and teaching staff
Today the student body is made of over 3,000 pupils from over 65 different nationalities, with most coming from France and other French-speaking countries or regions. Very few Singaporean students attend the school as the Singaporean government's regulations prevent most of its citizens from attending international schools within the country.

Alumni 

 Chea Serey, General Director of the National Bank of Cambodia

References

External links

 International French School of Singapore

Singapore
International schools in Singapore
Educational institutions established in 1984
1984 establishments in Singapore